Sir Richard Brownlow, 2nd Baronet (died 1668) of Humby in Lincolnshire, was a landowner.

Origins
He was the son and heir of Sir William Brownlow, 1st Baronet (c. 1595–1666) of Humby, younger brother of Sir John Brownlow, 1st Baronet (c. 1594–1679) of Belton, who died childless when his baronetcy became extinct. His mother was  Elizabeth Duncombe, daughter of William Duncombe.

Marriage and children
He married Elizabeth Freke, a daughter of John Freke of Stretton in Dorset, by whom he had children:
Sir John Brownlow, 3rd Baronet (1659-1697), eldest son, builder of the surviving Belton House, having inherited the estate of Belton and others from his childless great-uncle Sir John Brownlow, 1st Baronet (c. 1594-1679) of Belton. He died leaving four daughters and co-heiresses, the youngest of whom married her first-cousin John Brownlow, 1st Viscount Tyrconnel, 5th Baronet (1690-1754), of Belton House, but left no children.
Sir William Brownlow, 4th Baronet (1665-1701), the father of John Brownlow, 1st Viscount Tyrconnel, 5th Baronet (1690-1754), of Belton House, who in 1718 was raised to the Peerage of Ireland as Viscount Tyrconnel, but died childless.

References

1668 deaths
Year of birth missing
Baronets in the Baronetage of England
Richard, 2nd Baronet